Max Deuring (9 December 1907 – 20 December 1984) was a German mathematician. He is known for his work in arithmetic geometry, in particular on elliptic curves in characteristic p. He worked also in analytic number theory.

Deuring graduated from the University of Göttingen in 1930, then began working with Emmy Noether, who noted his mathematical acumen even as an undergraduate. When she was forced to leave Germany in 1933, she urged that the university offer her position to Deuring. In 1935 he published a report entitled Algebren ("Algebras"), which established his notability in the world of mathematics. He went on to serve as Ordinarius at Marburg and Hamburg, then took a position as ordentlicher Lehrstuhl at Göttingen, where he remained until his retirement.

Deuring was a fellow of the Leopoldina. His doctoral students include Max Koecher and Hans-Egon Richert.

Selected works
 Algebren, Springer 1935
 Sinn und Bedeutung der mathematischen Erkenntnis, Felix Meiner, Hamburg 1949
 Klassenkörper der komplexen Multiplikation, Teubner 1958
 Lectures on the theory of algebraic functions of one variable, 1973 (from lectures at the Tata Institute, Mumbai)

Sources
 Peter Roquette Über die algebraisch-zahlentheoretischen Arbeiten von Max Deuring, Jahresbericht DMV Vol.91, 1989, p. 109
 Martin Kneser Max Deuring, Jahresbericht DMV Vol.89, 1987, p. 135
 Martin Kneser, Martin Eichler Das wissenschaftliche Werk von Max Deuring, Acta Arithmetica Vol.47, 1986, p. 187

See also
Deuring–Heilbronn phenomenon
Birch and Swinnerton-Dyer conjecture
Supersingular elliptic curve

References

External links

MacTutor biography
 Obituary in Acta Arithmetica

 Biographical page

1907 births
1984 deaths
20th-century German mathematicians
Scientists from Göttingen
University of Göttingen alumni
Academic staff of the University of Göttingen
Academic staff of the University of Marburg
Academic staff of the University of Hamburg
Algebraic geometers